Exposure therapy is a technique in behavior therapy to treat anxiety disorders. Exposure therapy involves exposing the target patient to the anxiety source or its context without the intention to cause any danger (desensitization). Doing so is thought to help them overcome their anxiety or distress. Procedurally, it is similar to the fear extinction paradigm developed for studying laboratory rodents. Numerous studies have demonstrated its effectiveness in the treatment of disorders such as generalized anxiety disorder, social anxiety disorder, obsessive-compulsive disorder, post-traumatic stress disorder (PTSD), and specific phobias.

Medical uses

Generalized anxiety disorder
There is empirical evidence that exposure therapy can be an effective treatment for people with generalized anxiety disorder, citing specifically in vivo exposure therapy, (exposure through a real life situation), which has greater effectiveness than imaginal exposure in regards to generalized anxiety disorder. The aim of in vivo exposure treatment is to promote emotional regulation using systematic and controlled therapeutic exposure to traumatic stimuli. Exposure therapy is also a preferred method for children who struggle with anxiety.

Phobia
Exposure therapy is the most successful known treatment for phobias. Several published meta-analyses included studies of one-to-three hour single-session treatments of phobias, using imaginal exposure. At a post-treatment follow-up four years later 90% of people retained a considerable reduction in fear, avoidance, and overall level of impairment, while 65% no longer experienced any symptoms of a specific phobia.

Agoraphobia and social anxiety disorder are examples of phobias that have been successfully treated by exposure therapy.

Post-traumatic stress disorder

Exposure therapy in PTSD involves exposing the patient to PTSD-anxiety triggering stimuli, with the aim of weakening the neural connections between triggers and trauma memories (aka desensitisation). Exposure may involve:
 a real life trigger ("in vivo")
 an imagined trigger ("imaginal")
 Virtual reality exposure
 a triggered feeling generated in a physical way ("interoceptive").

Forms include:

Flooding – exposing the patient directly to a triggering stimulus, while simultaneously making them not feel afraid.
Systematic desensitisation (aka "graduated exposure") – gradually exposing the patient to increasingly vivid experiences that are related to the trauma, but do not trigger post-traumatic stress.
 Narrative exposure therapy - creates a written account of the traumatic experiences of a patient or group of patients, in a way that serves to recapture their self-respect and acknowledges their value. Under this name it is used mainly with refugees, in groups. It also forms an important part of cognitive processing therapy  and is conditionally recommended for treatment of PTSD by the American Psychological Association.
 Prolonged exposure therapy (PE) - a form of behavior therapy and cognitive behavioral therapy designed to treat post-traumatic stress disorder, characterized by two main treatment procedures – imaginal and in vivo exposures.  Imaginal exposure is a repeated 'on-purpose' retelling of the trauma memory.  In vivo exposure is gradually confronting situations, places, and things that are reminders of the trauma or feel dangerous (despite being objectively safe). Additional procedures include processing of the trauma memory and breathing retraining. The American Psychological Association strongly recommends PE as a first-line psychotherapy treatment for PTSD.

Researchers began experimenting with Virtual reality exposure (VRE) therapy in PTSD exposure therapy in 1997 with the advent of the "Virtual Vietnam" scenario. Virtual Vietnam was used as a graduated exposure therapy treatment for Vietnam veterans meeting the qualification criteria for PTSD. A 50-year-old Caucasian male was the first veteran studied. The preliminary results concluded improvement post-treatment across all measures of PTSD and maintenance of the gains at the six-month follow up. Subsequent open clinical trial of Virtual Vietnam using 16 veterans, showed a reduction in PTSD symptoms.

This method was also tested on several active duty Army soldiers, using an immersive computer simulation of military settings over six sessions. Self-reported PTSD symptoms of these soldiers were greatly diminished following the treatment.  Exposure therapy has shown promise in the treatment of co-morbid PTSD and substance abuse.

Obsessive compulsive disorder 
Exposure and response prevention (also known as exposure and ritual prevention; ERP or EX/RP) is a variant of exposure therapy that is recommended by the American Academy of Child and Adolescent Psychiatry (AACAP), the American Psychiatric Association (APA), and the Mayo Clinic as first-line treatment of obsessive compulsive disorder (OCD) citing that it has the richest empirical support for both youth and adolescent outcomes.

ERP is predicated on the idea that a therapeutic effect is achieved as subjects confront their fears, but refrain from engaging in the escape response or ritual that delays or eliminates distress. In the case of individuals with OCD or an anxiety disorder, there is a thought or situation that causes distress. Individuals usually combat this distress through specific behaviors that include avoidance or rituals. However, ERP involves purposefully evoking fear, anxiety, and or distress in the individual by exposing him/her to the feared stimulus. The response prevention then involves having the individual refrain from the ritualistic or otherwise compulsive behavior that functions to decrease distress. The patient is then taught to tolerate distress until it fades away on its own, thereby learning that rituals are not always necessary to decrease distress or anxiety. Over repeated practice of ERP, patients with OCD expect to find that they can have obsessive thoughts and images but not have the need to engage in compulsive rituals to decrease distress.

The AACAP's practice parameters for OCD recommends cognitive behavioral therapy, and more specifically ERP, as first line treatment for youth with mild to moderate severity OCD and combination psychotherapy and pharmacotherapy for severe OCD. The Cochrane Review's examinations of different randomized control trials echoes repeated findings of the superiority of ERP over waitlist control or pill-placebos, the superiority of combination ERP and pharmacotherapy, but similar effect sizes of efficacy between ERP or pharmacotherapy alone.

Techniques
Exposure therapy is based on the principle of respondent conditioning often termed Pavlovian extinction. The exposure therapist identifies the cognitions, emotions and physiological arousal that accompany a fear-inducing stimulus and then tries to break the pattern of escape that maintains the fear. This is done by exposing the patient to progressively stronger fear-inducing stimuli. Fear is minimized at each of a series of steadily escalating steps or challenges (a hierarchy), which can be explicit ("static") or implicit ("dynamic" — see Method of Factors) until the fear is finally gone. The patient is able to terminate the procedure at any time.

There are three types of exposure procedures. The first is in vivo or "real life." This type exposes the patient to actual fear-inducing situations. For example, if someone fears public speaking, the person may be asked to give a speech to a small group of people. The second type of exposure is imaginal, where patients are asked to imagine a situation that they are afraid of. This procedure is helpful for people who need to confront feared thoughts and memories. The third type of exposure is interoceptive, which may be used for more specific disorders such as panic or post-traumatic stress disorder. Patients confront feared bodily symptoms such as increased heart rate and shortness of breath. All types of exposure may be used together or separately.

While evidence clearly supports the effectiveness of exposure therapy, some clinicians are uncomfortable using imaginal exposure therapy, especially in cases of PTSD. They may not understand it, are not confident in their own ability to use it, or more commonly, they see significant contraindications for their client.

Flooding therapy also exposes the patient to feared stimuli, but it is quite distinct in that flooding starts at the most feared item in a fear hierarchy, while exposure starts at the least fear-inducing.

Exposure and response prevention
In the exposure and response prevention (ERP or EX/RP) variation of exposure therapy, the resolution to refrain from the escape response is to be maintained at all times and not just during specific practice sessions. Thus, not only does the subject experience habituation to the feared stimulus, but they also practice a fear-incompatible behavioral response to the stimulus. The distinctive feature is that individuals confront their fears and discontinue their escape response.  The American Psychiatric Association recommends ERP for the treatment of OCD, citing that ERP has the richest empirical support.

While this type of therapy typically causes some short-term anxiety, this facilitates long-term reduction in obsessive and compulsive symptoms. Generally, ERP incorporates a relapse prevention plan toward the end of the course of therapy.

History
The use of exposure as a mode of therapy began in the 1950s, at a time when psychodynamic views dominated Western clinical practice and behavioral therapy was first emerging. South African psychologists and psychiatrists first used exposure as a way to reduce pathological fears, such as phobias and anxiety-related problems, and they brought their methods to England in the Maudsley Hospital training program.

Joseph Wolpe (1915–1997) was one of the first psychiatrists to spark interest in treating psychiatric problems as behavioral issues. He sought consultation with other behavioral psychologists, among them James G. Taylor (1897–1973), who worked in the psychology department of the University of Cape Town in South Africa. Although most of his work went unpublished, Taylor was the first psychologist known to use exposure therapy treatment for anxiety, including methods of situational exposure with response prevention—a common exposure therapy technique still being used.
Since the 1950s, several sorts of exposure therapy have been developed, including systematic desensitization, flooding, implosive therapy, prolonged exposure therapy, in vivo exposure therapy, and imaginal exposure therapy.

Mindfulness
A 2015 review pointed out parallels between exposure therapy and mindfulness, stating that mindful meditation "resembles an exposure situation because [mindfulness] practitioners 'turn towards their emotional experience', bring acceptance to bodily and affective responses, and refrain from engaging in internal reactivity towards it." Imaging studies have shown that the ventromedial prefrontal cortex, hippocampus, and the amygdala are all affected by exposure therapy; imaging studies have shown similar activity in these regions with mindfulness training.

EMDR
Eye movement desensitization and reprocessing (EMDR) includes an element of exposure therapy (desensitization), though whether this is an effective method or not, is controversial.

Research
Exposure therapy can be investigated in the laboratory using Pavlovian extinction paradigms. Using rodents such as rats or mice to study extinction allows for the investigation of underlying neurobiological mechanisms involved, as well as testing of pharmacological adjuncts to improve extinction learning.

See also 

 Catharsis

Explanatory footnotes

References

Cognitive behavioral therapy
Behavior therapy
Behaviorism
Treatment of obsessive–compulsive disorder